Orange Spring ("Bahar Narenj") was a special Nowruz and New Year live program performed by Ehsan Alikhani, which aired on IRIB TV3 for two seasons for the years 1394 and 1397 in the Solar Hijri calendar. Orange Spring went on air of IRIB TV3 in the days close to the Iranian New Year and continued until the hours after the New Year, and was one of the most watched special programs of New Year of IRIB. The first season of this program was broadcast on 20 March 2015 until hours after the New Year Its second season was broadcast from 17 March 2018 until hours after the New Year on 20 March 2018. This talk show with the presence of famous guests and guests from the people tried to celebrate the New Year with the people in the last hours of the year and after the New Year, and entertain the viewers for hours.

About program 
This program was performed by Ehsan Alikhani and with the presence of tens of talents and prominent figures from various fields of science, culture, sports and art, as well as the young elites of the country, was a special program for New Year of IRIB TV3.

Title music

Guests

Season 1 (2015) 
 Mehran Ghafourian
 Javad Razavian
 Jamshid Mashayekhi
 Carlos Queiroz
 Mohsen Tanabandeh
 Mohammad Alizadeh
 Babak Jahanbakhsh
 Mohammad-Reza Hedayati
 Majid Salehi
 Players of Iran men's national volleyball team

Season 2 (2018) 
 Salar Aghili
 Mahsa Tahmasb
 Alireza Talischi
 Wall to Wall 2 actors
 Reza Rashidpour
 Macan Band
 Fereydoun Asraei
 Shahram Ghaedi
 Mohammad Bahrani
 Bahador Maleki
 Rambod Javan
 Puzzle Band
 Amir Tajik
 Javad Khiabani
 Farzad Farzin
 Mohammad Reza Moghadam
 Emad Talebzadeh
 Farshad Ahmadzadeh
 Kamal Kamyabinia
 Hossein Mahini
 Iman Ghiasi
 Mehdi Yarrahi
 Siamak Ansari
 Soroush Sehhat
 Bijan Banafshehkhah
 Bachelors actors
 Milad Babaei
 Shahab Mozafari
 Behnam Bani

Awards and nominations

References 

2015 Iranian television series debuts
2010s Iranian television series
Islamic Republic of Iran Broadcasting original programming